Nersik Ispiryan (born May 15, 1963) is an Armenian singer best known for his Armenian nationalistic songs.

Biography
Nersik Ispiryan was born in Yerevan, Armenian SSR, Soviet Union. He graduated from School No.160 in Erebuni district of Yerevan. He studied at Yerevan Komitas State Conservatory from 1986 to 1992, while singing in Akunk folk ensemble. He moved to the United States in 1995, because of pressure from Levon Ter-Petrosyan's anti-nationalist government, against him and other pro-Dashnak figures in mid-1990s.

Ispiryan is married with three children, 2 daughters (Ashken and Ani) and 1 son (Arabo).

Discography

Studio Albums
Nersik Vol 1 (1987)
Nersik Vol 2 (1988)
Armenian Country Dances (1992)
Armenian Patriotic Songs (1992)
Anmah Herosner (1994)
Aravod Er (1996)
Jan Jan Jan Aghchig (1997)
Ardziv Slatsir (1997)
Moderne Dances (1999)
Haverj Hokiner (1999)
Im Yerkn Ourish E (2000)
Goratz Ser (2001)
Yergirs Kancha (2002)
Dzyun (2004)
Vrezh (2005)
Aryan Kanche (2007)
Yergir Sassoun (2011)
Heros Kacherin (2011)
Veradardz Akunqnerin (2012)
Sa Hayastanne U Verj (2014)
Hay Mna (2015)

Compilation Albums
The Best (2010)

References

1963 births
Living people
Musicians from Yerevan
Armenian emigrants to the United States
21st-century American male singers
21st-century American singers
20th-century Armenian male singers
Armenian pop singers
Armenian nationalists
Honored artists of Armenia